Laurent Dominicé of Switzerland served as the Treasurer of the World Scout Committee.

In 1977, Dominicé was awarded the 117th Bronze Wolf, the only distinction of the World Organization of the Scout Movement, awarded by the World Scout Committee for exceptional services to world Scouting.

References

External links

Recipients of the Bronze Wolf Award
Year of birth missing
Scouting and Guiding in Switzerland
World Scout Committee members